Vivex was an early colour photography process invented by the research chemist Dr. Douglas Arthur Spencer (1901 - 1979). It was produced by the British company Colour Photography Ltd of Willesden, which operated the first professional colour printing service. The company was in business from 1928 until the start of World War II in 1939. Up until the war, the Vivex process accounted for 90% of UK colour print photography.

Vivex was a wash-off relief process using three negatives on waxed cellophane, one for each primary colour. It was a subtractive process, using cyan, magenta, and yellow primaries. The three negative plates could be exposed in sequence using a special automated camera back (designed for plate cameras) or simultaneously via the company's own VIVEX Tri-Colour Camera. After processing, the three negatives were printed on top of one another by hand to obtain the final print.

Although the fact that the image was built up from three exposures had disadvantages (such as getting the image in register), it also created the possibility of all manner of colour manipulation. A noted proponent of the Vivex process was Yevonde Middleton, who made use of Vivex's creative possibilities and whose work helped overcome public scepticism about the merits of colour photography.

References

See also
A short history of colour photography (National Science and Media Museum blog)

Photographic processes